The Rig Theater is a former cinema on East Hendricks Boulevard in Wink, Texas. It was built in 1928. It was listed on the National Register of Historic Places in 2003. It had a single screen as a cinema and had a seating capacity of 605. At the time of the theater's construction it was the only building in Wink made from masonry other than the town's school.

The Rig Theater was the childhood cinema of the young singer-songwriter Roy Orbison, where he spent many hours. Orbison performed at the Rig with his early bands, the Teen Kings and the Wink Westerners. Walt Quigley, a Roy Orbison tribute artist, is raising funds to reopen the Rig Theater and to move Wink's Roy Orbison Museum into the theater's lobby. Graffiti by Orbison and his friends from 1951 was found in the stairway to the balcony in 1999, and is preserved in a display at the Roy Orbison Museum. 

It is a two-part Early Commercial-style two-story building.

References

1928 establishments in Texas
Buildings and structures completed in 1928
Buildings and structures in Winkler County, Texas
Cinemas and movie theaters in Texas
Early Commercial architecture in the United States
National Register of Historic Places in Winkler County, Texas